Kpanpleu is a village in the far west of Ivory Coast. It is in the sub-prefecture of Séileu, Danané Department, Tonkpi Region, Montagnes District.

Until 2012, Kpanpleu was in the commune of Kpanpleu-Sin-Houyé. In March 2012, Kpanpleu-Sin-Houyé became one of 1126 communes nationwide that were abolished.

Notes

Populated places in Montagnes District
Populated places in Tonkpi